Time? Astonishing! is a collaborative studio album by American record producer L'Orange and American rapper Kool Keith. It was released via Mello Music Group on July 24, 2015. It features guest appearances from J-Live, Mr. Lif, Open Mike Eagle, Blu, Montage One, DJ Trackstar, MC Paul Barman, and MindsOne.

Critical reception

Dana Scott of HipHopDX wrote, "With L'Orange playing the part of Doc Brown to Kool Keith's Marty McFly, Time? Astonishing! has its moments that are both comforting to the cerebral and, maybe, to a stoner who has nothing else better to do than commence to star travel on a lazy afternoon." Mosi Reeves of Pitchfork stated that "One of its charms is hearing L'Orange adapt his sound to fit the mercurial Kool Keith's style." He added, "perhaps Kool Keith and L'Orange are satisfied with conjuring a mood of amusingly hallucinatory hip-hop that lasts just over 30 minutes, and then evaporates like a pleasurable high."

Under the Radar placed the album at number 10 on the "Top 15 Hip-Hop Albums of 2015" list.

Track listing

Personnel
Credits adapted from liner notes.

 L'Orange – production
 Kool Keith – vocals
 J-Live – vocals (2)
 Mr. Lif – vocals (4)
 Open Mike Eagle – vocals (5)
 Blu – vocals (7)
 Montage One – vocals (7)
 DJ Trackstar – turntables (7)
 MC Paul Barman – vocals (9)
 MindsOne – vocals (10)
 Seiji Itaru Inouye – mixing
 Eric Morgeson – mastering
 Michael Tolle – executive production
 Zach Kashkett – art direction
 Jon Webb – photography
 Rick Parker – photography
 Sarah Dalton – design
 Whitney Oppenheimer – design

References

External links
 Time? Astonishing! at Bandcamp
 

2015 albums
Collaborative albums
Kool Keith albums
Mello Music Group albums